In metallurgy, refraction is a property of metals that indicates their ability to withstand heat.  Metals with a high degree of refraction are referred to as refractory.  These metals derive their high melting points from their strong intermolecular forces.  Large quantities of energy are required to overcome intermolecular forces.

Some refractory metals include molybdenum, niobium, tungsten, and tantalum.  These materials are also noted for their high elastic modulus and hardness.

See also
 Refractory, as applied to nonmetallic substances
 Flame retardant

References 

Metallurgy